Longhu may refer to the following locations in China:

Mount Longhu (龙虎山), in Jiangxi
Longhu District (龙湖区), Shantou, Guangdong

Towns (龙湖镇) 
Longhu, Fujian, in Jinjiang
Longhu, Chao'an County, Guangdong
Longhu, Wuzhou, in Dieshan District, Wuzhou, Guangxi
Longhu, Hainan, in Ding'an County
Longhu, Henan, in Xinzheng
Longhu, Jiangxi, in Nancheng County

Townships 
Longhu Township, Guangxi (龙虎乡), in Gongcheng Yao Autonomous County
Longhu Township, Hebei (龙虎乡), in She County